Jean-Claude Lebaube  (July 22, 1937 at Renneville, France – May 2, 1977 in Verneuil-sur-Avre, Eure, France) was a French professional road bicycle racer. He was professional from 1961 to 1969 and won 8 victories. He rode in 7 editions of the Tour de France where he wore the yellow jersey as leader of the general classification for one day in 1966. Other career highlights included a stage win in the Dauphiné Libéré and the Tour de Luxembourg.

Palmarès 

1961
Tour de Tunesie
1963
Gouesnou
Tour du Sud-Est
Tour de France:
4th place overall classification
1965
Tour de France:
5th place overall classification
1966
Boucles Pertuisiennes
Tour de France:
Wearing yellow jersey for one day

External links 

Official Tour de France results for Jean-Claude Lebaube
Palmarès of Jean-Claude Lebaube

French male cyclists
1937 births
1977 deaths
Sportspeople from Eure
Cyclists from Normandy